Will Holder (born 1969 in Hatfield, Hertfordshire) is an English typographer based in Brussels. Holder explores the organisation of language around artworks through printed matter, live readings and dialogues with other artists. He is the editor of F.R.DAVID, a journal concerned with reading and writing in the arts.

In May 2009, Holder co-curated TalkShow (with Richard Birkett) at the ICA, London. Together with Alex Waterman, he edited and typeset operatic scores for Yes, But Is It Edible?, the music of Robert Ashley, for two or more voices.

During 2015–2016, Holder exhibited in the touring British Art Show 8. In 2015 he received a Paul Hamlyn Award for Artists.

Works
David Osbaldeston, Inflection Sandwich
Chris Evans, Goofy Audit
Falke Pisano, Figures of Speech
For the Blind Man in the Dark Room Looking for the Black Cat that isn't there
Otolith Group, A Long Time Between Suns
Jaki Irvine, The Square Root of Minus One is Plus or Minus i
Ryan Gander, Intellectual Colours

References

External links
 Frieze Magazine - Will Holder
 Will Holder interviewed at Ràdio Web MACBA

English designers
English contemporary artists
1969 births
Living people